(What's the Story) Morning Glory? Tour was a world concert tour by English band Oasis in support of their hugely successful second album (What's the Story) Morning Glory?.  The tour, which spanned the UK, Europe, the US and Canada, included 103 shows over a period of several months in 1995 and 1996 amidst twelve different tour legs and several cancelled legs in the US and Australia/New Zealand. The tour started on 22 June 1995 with a pre-Glastonbury festival warm up gig at the Bath Pavilion which featured the debut of new drummer Alan White and several new songs off the album which wasn't to be officially released until early October, and ended on 10 September 1996 at the Nissan Pavilion in Bristow, Virginia, when the band decided to halt touring to focus on the recording of their anticipated third album, Be Here Now.

The tour is notable for its UK summer leg of 1996 which consisted of several open-air concerts to record crowds. The tour included such venues as Maine Road in Manchester, Loch Lomond in Scotland, Páirc Uí Chaoimh in Ireland and Knebworth Park in England in which the band played to 250,000 people over two nights. Unprecedented for an open-air concert in the UK at the time, the gig also holds the record for the largest ever ticket demand in history with nearly three million (1 in 20 people) ticket applications.

Whilst the tour was taking place, (What's the Story) Morning Glory? had become a worldwide success and Oasis became one of the biggest bands of the era. The Gallagher brothers regularly made tabloid headlines for their frequent fallouts and rockstar lifestyles. The tour had many disruptions and cancellations due to Noel twice walking out of the group, and Liam pulling out of a US leg. When the band broke up for a brief time in late 1996, several US tour dates and the entire Australia and New Zealand leg had to be cancelled. On one such occasion, Oasis were due to perform on MTV Unplugged at the Royal Festival Hall in London when Liam pulled out minutes before the group were to take to the stage; citing a sore throat as to why he could not perform. Noel had to take over lead vocals for the entire performance whilst Liam heckled him from a balcony in the crowd. The band later found out that Liam did not like performing acoustically.

Nevertheless, the tour had escalated Oasis from being one of the biggest bands in Britain to being one of the biggest bands in the world; resulting in a media frenzy and unprecedented anticipation for the group's third album.

The Earl's Court and Maine Road gigs were filmed and later released as the Oasis VHS/DVD ...There and Then.

Set list 
The band's typical set list was:

"The Swamp Song"
"Acquiesce"
"Supersonic"
"Hello"
"Some Might Say"
"Roll with It"
"Morning Glory"
"Cigarettes & Alcohol"
"Slide Away"
"Champagne Supernova"
"Whatever"
"Wonderwall"
"Cast No Shadow"
"Don't Look Back in Anger"
"Live Forever"
"I Am the Walrus"

Other songs performed:
"Shakermaker"
"Round Are Way"
"Rock 'N' Roll Star"
"The Masterplan"
"Talk Tonight"
"Listen Up"
"Columbia"
"Fade Away" (Acoustic)
"It's Better People"
"(It's Good) To Be Free"
"Rockin' Chair"
"Take Me Away" played only two times in the whole tour
"Cum On Feel the Noize" played at both Maine Road gigs only
"My Big Mouth" played at the Loch Lomond gig, Allstate Arena (formerly Rosemont Horizon) gig, and at Knebworth
"It's Getting Better (Man!!)" also played at the Loch Lomond gig, and at Knebworth

Credits:
"I Am the Walrus" written by Lennon-McCartney
"Cum On Feel the Noize" written by Jim Lea and Noddy Holder
All remaining tracks written by Noel Gallagher

Tour dates

See also 
List of highest-attended concerts

References 

Oasis (band) concert tours
1995 concert tours
1996 concert tours